Kabyle grammar is the grammar of the Kabyle language.

CS:construct state
FS:free state
ANN:annexed state
ABS:free state

Nouns and adjectives

Gender
As an Afro-Asiatic language, Kabyle has only two genders, masculine and feminine. Like most Berber languages, masculine nouns and adjectives generally start with a vowel (a-, i-, u-), while the feminine nouns generally start with t- and end with a -t (there are some exceptions, however). Note that most feminine nouns are in fact feminized versions of masculine nouns.

Examples: 
aqcic "a boy", taqcict "a girl".
amɣar "an old man", tamɣart "an old woman".
argaz "a man", tameṭṭut "a woman".
izi "a fly", tizit "mosquito".

Pluralization
Singular nouns generally start with an a-, and do not have a suffix. Plural nouns generally start with an i- and often have a suffix such as -en. There are three types of plural : External, Internal, Mixed:

External or "Regular": consists in changing the initial vowel of the noun, and adding a suffix -n,
amɣar "an old man" → imɣaren "old men".
argaz → irgazen "men"
ul → ulawen "hearts"

Internal: involves only a change in the vowels within the word:
adrar → idurar "mountain"
amicic "a cat" → imcac "cats"

Mixed: combines a change of vowels (within the word) with the suffix -n:
igenni "sky" → igenwan "skies".
izi → izan "fly"
aẓar → iẓuran "root"
afus → ifassen "hands"

Free and annexed state
The former is often called free state, the latter construct state. The construct state of the noun derives from the free state through one of the following rules:

The first involves a vowel alternation, whereby the vowel a become u :
amaziɣ → umaziɣ "Berber"
ameqqran → umeqqran "big"
adrar → udrar "mountain"
The second involves the loss of the initial vowel in the case of some feminine nouns (the sound represented by the letter 'e' is not considered a true vowel):
tamɣart → temɣart "women"
tamdint → temdint "town"
tamurt → tmurt "country"
The third involves the addition of a semi-vowel (w or y) word-initially:
asif → wasif "river"
aḍu → waḍu "wind"
iles → yiles "tongue"
uccen → wuccen "jackal"
Finally, some nouns do not change for free state:
taddart → taddart "village"
tuccent → tuccent "female jackal"

Depending on the role of the noun in the sentence, it takes either its free or annexed state.

When located after a verb, the direct object of the verb takes the free state, while the subject is in the annexed state.

When the direct object is indicated on the verb by a direct object affix, the direct object's identity may be restated in the annexed state.

When a noun is moved in front of the verb to establish it as the sentence topic, it remains in its free state.

After a preposition (at the exception of "ar" and "s"), all nouns take their annexed state. Hence the free-state noun aman (water), annexed state waman, can form kas n waman, (a glass of water), with the preposition n "of" triggering the construct state's appearance.

Verbs
Kabyle verbs inflect for four paradigms of tense–aspect–mood, three of them conventionally labelled the preterite (expressing perfective aspect), intensive aorist (expressing imperfective aspect) and aorist (essentially functioning like an irrealis or subjunctive mood). Unlike other Berber languages, where it is used to express the present, the aorist alone is rarely used in Kabyle, instead often appearing with an accompanying particle. The preterite also has an accompanying negative paradigm which may or may not differ from that of the non-negative preterite depending on the verb.

"Weak verbs" have a preterite form that is the same as their aorist. Examples of weak verbs that follow are conjugated at the first person of the singular:

"Strong verbs" or "irregular verbs":

Conjugation
Conjugation in Kabyle is done by adding affixes (prefixes, suffixes or both). These affixes are static and identical for all finite stems, with only the theme changing.

A group of stative/resultative verbs (such as  "to be/become big or old") use a different set of person-number endings in their preterites, which contains only suffixes.

As an example, the full finite conjugation of the verb afeg "to fly" exhibiting its four themes (preterite ufeg, negative preterite ufig , aorist afeg, and intensive aorist ttafeg) is given below. For Kabyle verbs, the citation form of a verb is the second-person singular imperative.

The participles in Kabyle are used as a means of expressing relative phrases in which the preceding noun is the participle's subject. In the following proverb, ur nxeddem "who doesn't work" modifies argaz "man".

Each Kabyle verb has five participles, all formed by attaching various affixes onto a corresponding finite stem.

Verb framing
Kabyle is a satellite-framed based language, Kabyle verbs use two particles to show the path of motion:
d orients toward the speaker, and could be translated as "here".
n orients toward the interlocutor or toward a certain place, and could be translated as "there".

Examples:
 « iruḥ-d » (he came), « iruḥ-n » (he went).
 « awi-d aman» (bring the water), « awi-n aman » (carry away the water).

Negation
Kabyle usually expresses negation in two parts, with the particle ur attached to the verb, and one or more negative words that modify the verb or one of its arguments. For example, simple verbal negation is expressed by « ur » before the verb and the particle « ara » after the verb:
« Urareɣ » ("I played") → « Ur urareɣ ara » ("I did not play")

Other negative words (acemma ... etc.) are used in combination with ur to express more complex types of negation.

Verb derivation
Verb derivation is done by adding affixes. There are three types of derivation forms : Causative, reflexive and Passive.

Causative: obtained by prefixing the verb with s- / sse- / ssu- :
ffeɣ "to go out" → ssuffeɣ "to make to go out"
kcem "to enter" → ssekcem "to make to enter, to introduce"
irid "to be washed" → ssired "to wash".
Reflexive: obtained by prefixing the verb with m- / my(e)- / myu-:
ẓer "to see" → mẓer "to see each other"
ṭṭef "to hold" → myuṭṭaf "to hold each other".
Passive: is obtained by prefixing the verb with ttu- / ttwa- / tt- / mm(e)- / n- / nn-:
krez "to plough" → ttwakrez "to be ploughed"
ečč "to eat" → mmečč "to be eaten".
Complex forms: obtained by combining two or more of the previous prefixes:
enɣ "to kill" → mmenɣ "to kill each other" → smenɣ "to make to kill each other"
Two prefixes can cancel each other:
enz "to be sold" → zzenz "to sell"  → ttuzenz "to be sold" (ttuzenz = enz !!).

Agent noun 
Every verb has a corresponding agent noun. In English it could be translated into verb+er. It is obtained by prefixing the verb with « am- » or with « an- » if the first letter is b / f / m / w (there are exceptions however).

Examples:
ṭṭef "to hold" → anaṭṭaf "holder"
inig "to travel" → iminig "traveller"
eks "to graze" → ameksa "shepherd"

Action noun
Every verb has a corresponding action noun, which in English it could be translated into verb+ing:

ffer "to hide" → tuffra "hiding" (stem VI), « Tuffra n tidett ur telhi » — "Hiding the truth is bad".

There are 6 regular stems of forming action nouns, and the 7th is for quality verbs : (C for consonant, V for vowel)

Examples:
ɣeẓẓ "to bite" → aɣẓaẓ
zdi "to be united" → azday
ini "to say" → timenna

Predicative particle "d"
The predicative particle "d" is an indispensable tool in speaking Kabyle, "d" is equivalent to both "it is + adjective" and "to be + adjective", but cannot be replaced by the verb "ili" (to be). It is always followed by a noun (free state).

Examples:
D taqcict, "it's a girl".
D nekk, "it's me".
Nekk d argaz, "I'm a man".
Idir d anelmad, "Idir is a student".
Idir yella d anelmad, "Idir was a student".

The predicative particle "d" should not be confused with the particle of coordination "d"; indeed, the latter is followed by a noun at its annexed state while the first is always followed by a noun at its free state.

Pronoun

Personal pronouns 

Example : « Ula d nekk. » — "Me too."

Possessive pronouns 

Example : « Axxam-nneɣ. » — "Our house." (House-our)

Pronouns of the verb 

Direct object

Example : « Yuɣ-it. » — "He bought it." (He.bought-it)

Indirect object

Example : « Yenna-yas. » — "He said to him." (He.said-to.him)
Complex example (Mixing indirect and direct object) : « Yefka-yas-t. » — "He gave it to him." (He.gave-to.him-it)

Demonstratives 
There are three demonstratives, near-deictic ('this, these'), far-deictic ('that, those') and absence:

Suffix: Used with a noun, example : « Axxam-agi» — "This house." (House-this).

 Isolated : Used when we omit the subject we are speaking about : «Wagi yelha» — "This is nice." (This-is.nice)

Numerotation
Only the first two numbers are Berber; for higher numbers, Arabic is used. They are yiwen (f. yiwet) "one", sin (f. snat) "two". The noun being counted follows it in the genitive: sin n yirgazen "two men".

"First" and "last" are respectively amezwaru and aneggaru (regular adjectives).  Other ordinals are formed with the prefix wis (f. tis): wis sin "second (m.)", tis tlata "third (f.)", etc.

Prepositions
Prepositions precede their objects: « i medden » "to the people", « si temdint » "from the town".   All words preceded by a preposition (at the exception of « s » and « ar », "towards", "until" ) take their annexed state.

Some prepositions have two forms : one is used with pronominal suffixes and the other form is used in all other contexts.

Also some of these prepositions have a corresponding relative pronoun (or interrogative), example:

« i » "for/to" → « iwumi » "to whom"
« Tefka aksum i wemcic » "she gave meat to the cat" → « Amcic iwumi tefka aksum » "The cat to whom she gave meat"

Conjunctions
Conjunctions precede the verb: mi yiwweḍ "when he arrived", muqel ma yusa-d "see if he came".

Bibliography
Achab, R. : 1996 – La néologie lexicale berbère (1945–1995), Paris/Louvain, Editions Peeters, 1996.
Achab, R. : 1998 – Langue berbère. Introduction à la notation usuelle en caractères latins, Paris, Editions Hoggar.
F. Amazit-Hamidchi & M. Lounaci : Kabyle de poche, Assimil, France, 
 Dallet, Jean-Marie. 1982. Dictionnaire kabyle–français, parler des At Mangellet, Algérie. Études etholinguistiques Maghreb–Sahara 1, ser. eds. Salem Chaker, and Marceau Gast. Paris: Société d’études linguistiques et anthropologiques de France.
 Hamid Hamouma.  n.d.  Manuel de grammaire berbère (kabyle).  Paris:  Edition Association de Culture Berbère.
 Kamal Nait-Zerrad.  Grammaire moderne du kabyle, tajerrumt tatrart n teqbaylit. Editions KARTHALA, 2001. 
Mammeri, M. : 1976 – Tajerrumt n tmaziɣt (tantala taqbaylit), Maspero, Paris.
Naït-Zerrad, K. : 1994 – Manuel de conjugaison kabyle (le verbe en berbère), L’Harmattan, Paris.
Naït-Zerrad, K. : 1995 – Grammaire du berbère contemporain, I – Morphologie, ENAG, Alger.
 Salem Chaker.  1983.  Un parler berbere d'Algerie (Kabyle):  syntax.  Provence:  Université de Provence.
Tizi-Wwuccen. Méthode audio-visuelle de langue berbère (kabyle), Aix-en-Provence, Edisud, 1986.

References

External links
 Kabyle verb conjugator

Afroasiatic grammars
Berber languages
Languages of Algeria